Inyoni may refer to:-

Inyoni, a model of knife manufactured by Chris Reeve Knives 2005–15; 2022-present
 a South African steamship in service 1957–62